The 2008 Maryland Republican presidential primary took place on February 12, 2008. The state sent 37 delegates to the 2008 Republican National Convention in St. Paul, Minnesota. Three delegates were awarded to the winner of each of the state's eight congressional districts; the remainder of the state's delegates were at-large.  John McCain won the primary election.

In opinion polling conducted on February 7 and 8, John McCain was the heavy favorite among Maryland's Republican voters. 56% of respondents supported him, 17% Mike Huckabee, 10% Ron Paul, with the rest scattered or undecided.

The District of Columbia and State of Virginia held their primaries on the same date, leading the day to be dubbed the "Potomac primary" by many pundits, after the river that borders all three jurisdictions.

Results

*Candidate suspended campaign prior to this primary

See also
 2008 Maryland Democratic presidential primary
 2008 Republican Party presidential primaries

References

Maryland
Republican presidential primary
Maryland Republican primaries